Vidriži Parish is an administrative unit of Limbaži Municipality, Latvia.

Towns, villages and settlements of Vidriži Parish 
  - parish administrative center

References 

Parishes of Latvia
Limbaži Municipality